The 1961–62 Yugoslav First League season was the 16th season of the First Federal League, the top level association football league of SFR Yugoslavia, since its establishment in 1946. Twelve teams contested the competition, with Partizan winning their fourth title.

Teams
At the end of the previous season RNK Split and Radnički Belgrade were relegated. They were replaced by FK Novi Sad and Borac Banja Luka.

League table

Results

Winning squad
Champions:
  FK Partizan (head coach: Stjepan Bobek)
player (league matches/league goals)
Velibor Vasović (22/2)
Milutin Šoškić (22/0) (goalkeeper)
Milan Galić (21/7)
Fahrudin Jusufi (21/0)
Vladica Kovačević (19/15)
Milan Vukelić (17/6)
Joakim Vislavski (17/3)
Velimir Sombolac (17/0)
Lazar Radović (16/2)
Branislav Mihajlović (16/0)
Zvezdan Čebinac (14/3)
Milorad Milutinović (12/0)
Radivoj Ognjanović (9/1)
Dragoslav Jovanović (8/0)
Ljubomir Mihajlović (6/0)
Dragomir Slišković (4/1)
Ivan Rajić (3/1)
Miodrag Petrović (3/0)
Vladimir Petrović (3/0)
Bruno Belin (2/0)
Mustafa Hasanagić (1/0)

Top scorers

See also
1961–62 Yugoslav Second League
1961–62 Yugoslav Cup

External links
Yugoslavia Domestic Football Full Tables

Yugoslav First League seasons
Yugo
1961–62 in Yugoslav football